Radhadamodar Sanskrit Vidyapith is one of affiliated government Sanskrit universities of Nepal Sanskrit University at Jaitar of Sankhar village development committee in Syangja District of Nepal. This campus offers Uttarmadhyama (Intermediate) as well as Shastri (Bachelor) levels of study.

References

External links 
Nepal Sanskrit University

Universities and colleges in Nepal
1995 establishments in Nepal
Buildings and structures in Syangja District